Foothills is a federal electoral district in Alberta, Canada, that has been represented in the House of Commons of Canada since 2015.

History
Foothills was created by the 2012 federal electoral boundaries redistribution and was legally defined in the 2013 representation order. It came into effect upon the call of the 42nd Canadian federal election, scheduled for October 19, 2015. It was created out of the bulk of Macleod, plus very small parts of Lethbridge (Waterton Lakes National Park) and Calgary Southwest (a small section north of Spruce Meadows).

The name of the riding refers to the Rocky Mountain Foothills, which spread across southwestern Alberta from the Continental Divide at the British Columbia border.

Members of Parliament

This riding has elected the following members of the House of Commons of Canada:

Election results

References

Alberta federal electoral districts
High River
Okotoks